Events from the 1120s in England.

Incumbents
Monarch – Henry I

Events
 1120
 25 November – sinking of the White Ship in the English Channel off Barfleur. King Henry I of England's only legitimate son, William Adelin, is among 300 who drown.
 1121
 24 January – Henry I marries Adeliza of Louvain at Windsor Castle.
 June – Reading Abbey founded by Henry I.
 Plympton Priory in Devon re-founded as an Augustinian house by William Warelwast, Bishop of Exeter.
 Foss Dyke scoured.
 1122
 Priory of St Frideswide, Oxford, established as an Augustinian house.
 1123
 18 February – William de Corbeil enthroned as Archbishop of Canterbury.
 26 August – first Bishop of Bath (Godfrey) consecrated.
 Louis VI of France supports rebels against English rule in Normandy.
 St Bartholomew's Hospital in London founded by Rahere.
 1124
 Henry I unsuccessfully invades the Kingdom of France, having defeated rebels in Normandy.
 Christmas – moneyers punished by castration following runaway inflation.
 1125
 William of Malmesbury completes his histories of England, Gesta Regum Anglorum and Gesta Pontificum Anglorum.
 1126
 Archbishoprics of Canterbury and York declared equal.
 25 December – Henry I asks his nobles to recognise Empress Matilda as his heir.
 1127
 1 January – English nobles accept Matilda as heir.
 1128
 17 June – Matilda marries Geoffrey Plantagenet, heir to the Count of Anjou.
 Foundation of the first Cistercian abbey in England, at Waverley in Surrey.
 1129
 4 October – Henry of Blois becomes Bishop of Winchester, an office which he will hold until his death in 1171.

Births
 1125
Renaud de Courtenay, noble (died 1194)

Deaths
 1120
 25 November – White Ship
William Adelin, son of Henry I (born 1103)
 Richard d'Avranches, 2nd Earl of Chester, Anglo-Norman noble and soldier (born 1094)
 Matilda FitzRoy, Countess of Perche, illegitimate daughter of King Henry I of England
 1122
 20 October – Ralph d'Escures, Archbishop of Canterbury
 1124
 15 March – Ernulf, Bishop of Rochester (born 1040, France)
 1126
Edgar Ætheling, last member of the Anglo-Saxon royal house (born 1052)
 1128
 5 September – Ranulf Flambard, Bishop of Durham
 1129
 January – Ranulph le Meschin, 1st Earl of Chester (born 1074, France)
 Symeon of Durham, chronicler

References